The name Rammasun has been used to name three tropical cyclones in the western north Pacific Ocean. The name was contributed by Thailand, which means the 'god of thunder'.

Typhoon Rammasun (2002) (T0205, 09W, Florita) – brought flooding to the Philippines
Typhoon Rammasun (2008) (T0802, 03W, Butchoy)
Typhoon Rammasun (2014) (T1409, 09W, Glenda) – a Category 5 super typhoon that impacted the Philippines and China

The name Rammasun was retired after the 2014 typhoon season and replaced with the name Bualoi which is a kind of Thai dessert.

Rammasun